Gary Brown may refer to:

Sports
 Gary Brown (running back) (1969–2022), American football running back and coach
 Gary Brown (offensive lineman) (born 1971), American football player
 Gary Brown (rugby union) (born 1980), Irish rugby player
 Gary Brown (footballer) (born 1985), former Rochdale footballer
 Gary Brown (baseball) (born 1988), American baseball outfielder
 Gary Brown (cricketer) (born 1965), former English cricketer

Other
 Gary Brown (politician) (born 1953), politician from Detroit, Michigan
 Gary Brown (musician), American bass player, see Speak No Evil and Motéma Music
 Gary R. Brown (born 1963), United States District Judge for the Eastern District of New York
 Gary D. Brown, lawyer, whistleblower, former deputy to Harvey Rishikof, when he was the Guantanamo military commission, convening authority

See also
Gary Browne (disambiguation)
Garry Brown (disambiguation)